Christopher R. Cockrum (born December 24, 1986) is an American professional stock car racing driver. He last competed part-time in the NASCAR Xfinity Series, driving the No. 25 Chevrolet Camaro for ACG Motorsports.

Racing career

Cockrum began his racing career at the age of 8, competing in kart racing events; he transitioned to full-bodied stock cars at 16. He moved to the ARCA Re/Max Series in 2006, making his series debut at Kentucky Speedway in Mark Gibson's No. 56 car. He ran nine races in the series between 2006 and 2010, posting a best finish of twelfth at Daytona International Speedway in 2010 in his family-owned No. 28 car.

Cockrum moved up to the NASCAR Camping World Truck Series in 2011, making his debut in the at Atlanta Motor Speedway for Turn One Racing, finishing 24th. He drove in the first four races of the 2012 season for RSS Racing, posting a best finish of 16th in the season-opening event at Daytona before leaving the team.

The 2013 season saw Cockrum joining SS-Green Light Racing for the Truck Series season opener at Daytona, finishing 15th, his best career run in the series.

In 2014, Cockrum ran the season-opening Truck Series race at Daytona International Speedway; in May, he announced he would attempt to make his debut in the Nationwide Series at Charlotte Motor Speedway.

In 2015, Cockrum joined MBM Motorsports to drive the No. 13 Chevrolet for one race at Daytona, where he finished career best finish 21st. Cockrum also raced at his hometown track Atlanta where he finished 29th, driving the No. 15 Chevrolet for RWR. Cockrum joined a new Xfinity Series team Deese Racing Enterprises, driving the No. 35 Chevrolet to attempt to qualify at Talledega but he failed to. Cockrum formed his team to race at the fall Daytona race but he failed to qualify.

In 2019, Cockrum scored his first Xfinity Series top-ten at Talladega Superspeedway, driving the No. 17 car.

Motorsports career results

NASCAR
(key) (Bold – Pole position awarded by qualifying time. Italics – Pole position earned by points standings or practice time. * – Most laps led.)

Xfinity Series

Camping World Truck Series

 Season still in progress 
 Ineligible for series points

ARCA Racing Series
(key) (Bold – Pole position awarded by qualifying time. Italics – Pole position earned by points standings or practice time. * – Most laps led.)

References

External links
 
 

Living people
1986 births
People from Conyers, Georgia
Racing drivers from Atlanta
Racing drivers from Georgia (U.S. state)
NASCAR drivers
ARCA Menards Series drivers
Sportspeople from the Atlanta metropolitan area